Bouchiat is the surname of a family of notable French physicists:
Claude Bouchiat (born 1932), French physicist, husband of Marie-Anne and father of Hélène
Hélène Bouchiat (born 1958), French physicist, daughter of Claude and Marie-Anne
Marie-Anne Bouchiat (born 1934), French physicist, wife of Claude and mother of Hélène
Vincent Bouchiat (born 1970), French physicist